Daniel Bermúdez Samper (born 1950) is a Colombian architect, and Professor at the Faculty of Architecture and Design of the University of the Andes.

Daniel was born in 1950 in Bogotá. His father was modern architect Guillermo Bermúdez Umaña and his mother was Graciela Samper Gnecco. He is an alumnus of the University of the Andes where he graduated in Architecture in 1973

Since 1975 he has been a faculty member of the Universidad de Los Andes teaching at the Department of Architecture and Design. He is currently coordinator of the Degree project course (BA), part of the faculty team in charge of thesis projects and a member of the Architecture, City and Education (ACE) research team.

Awards
He received the Bienal Colombiana de Arquitectura (1992, 1998 and 2004), the Asocreto Concrete Excellence Award (1998, 2002, 2004)), and the XIII Premio Obras Cemex award (2004).

Bermúdez critiqued the work of fellow Colombian architect Giancarlo Mazzanti

Daniel Bermúdez Samper has been an independent architect since 1975.

Projects
Master plan for the Universidad de los Andes campus including Alberto Lleras Camargo and Carlos Pacheco Devia buildings 
library, auditorium, gallery, postgraduate building and square for the Universidad Jorge Tadeo Lozano
He was director of the collaborative city planning project Ciudad Salitre
 Two of Bogotá’s large scale public libraries
Cultural Centre Julio Mario Santo Domingo

Other activities
Daniel Bermúdez Samper was a member of the Holcim Awards jury for region Latin America in 2008.

Personal life
Daniel was born to Guillermo Bermúdez Umaña, also an architect, and his wife Graciela Samper Gnecco. He married Inés Obregón Martínez de Irujo, also an architect, on 18 June 1981.

References

1950 births
Living people
People from Bogotá
Samper family
University of Los Andes (Colombia) alumni
Academic staff of the University of Los Andes (Colombia)
Colombian architects